Carmenta rubricincta is a moth of the family Sesiidae. It was described by William Beutenmüller in 1909. It is known from North America, including Arizona.

References

Sesiidae
Moths described in 1909